Gramos (or Γράμμος) is a mountain range on the border of Albania and Greece. The mountain is part of the northern Pindus mountain range. The region is inhabited by Albanians, Aromanians and Greeks.

The brown bear occurs in the region.

Geography
The Gramos is situated on the borders of the Kolonjë district of Albania and the Ioannina and Kastoria regional units of Greece. Three ridges join at its highest peak, running towards the north, southwest, and east. The Gramos is drained towards the west by the river Osum, towards the northwest by the Devoll, towards the northeast by the Aliakmonas and towards the south by the Sarantaporos. The Gramos is very sparsely populated, the only sizable town being Ersekë (Albania) at its western foot. Other villages in the mountains are Gramos (northeast), Aetomilitsa (southeast), Starje (west) and Plikati (south). Nearby mountain ranges are the Smolikas to the south, Voio to the east, and Ostrovicë to the northwest.

History
The mountain was a major communist stronghold in the Greek Civil War. The provisional democratic government (i.e. the communist government) had its headquarters in the vicinity. It fell to the national government only in 1949, bringing the near conclusion of the Greek Civil war since after its fall only isolated pockets were left in communist control. The mountain still has live minefields from the civil war despite decades of demining and access to parts of the mountain is perilous.

See also
 List of mountains in Albania
 List of mountains in Greece

References

External links

 Greek Mountain Flora

Geography of Korçë County
Landforms of Ioannina (regional unit)
Landforms of Kastoria (regional unit)
Mountains of Albania
Albania–Greece border
International mountains of Europe
Mountains of Epirus (region)
Mountains of Western Macedonia
Natura 2000 in Greece